This article details Car Nos. 4–9 of the Manx Electric Railway on the Isle of Man.

This was the second batch of cars delivered to the railway for its opening as far as Laxey Station in 1894. Referred to as "tunnel cars" because their seating was originally parallel to the sides with just one large passenger saloon, typical of early trams, as opposed to the more usual reversible seating common in tramcar layout. They are still in regular use today except for Nos. 4 and 8 which were destroyed by the Laxey Car Shed fire in 1930. Some cars were later modified; car 5, for instance, now has reversible plush seating and car 6 did until recently retain its joint front windows but now has the central pillar removed from the driver's window to increase visibility. In 1993, car 9 was selected as the illuminated tram, adorned with modern rope lights giving rise to controversy among the M.E.R. faithful.

While cars 5 and 6 have remained in regular traffic, Car No. 7 was relegated to permanent way duties for a number of years and was in very poor condition. In early 2010, this car was removed from the system and extensively rebuilt by an on-island contractor, returning in a deep blue colour scheme, believed to have been that originally carried by this class of car upon delivery. The refit also saw the removal of longitudinal bench seating and its replacement with reversible tramway-type seating similar to that carried by sister car No. 5, thereby slightly reducing the passenger carrying capacity.

References

Also
Manx Electric Railway Rolling Stock

Sources
 Manx Manx Electric Railway Fleetlist (2002) Manx Electric Railway Society
 Island Island Images: Manx Electric Railway Pages (2003) Jon Wornham
 Official Official Tourist Department Page (2009) Isle Of Man Heritage Railways

Manx Electric Railway